Michelle Angela Garvey (June 3, 1967 – July 1, 1982) was an American teenage girl murdered in Texas within a month of running away from her home in Connecticut. Her body was quickly found but remained unidentified until a 2014 DNA test, after an amateur Internet researcher suggested a match between the Texas unidentified decedent and Connecticut missing-person data.

Circumstances 
Michelle Garvey went missing from New London, Connecticut, presumably after running away from home, on June 1, 1982, at the age of fourteen. She was believed to have intended to return to her birth state, New Jersey, or to North Carolina. She had a previous history of running away, according to the National Center for Missing and Exploited Children. Initially, it was unknown what had happened to Garvey, as she may have left home to start a new life and was thought to have possibly been still alive.

Discovery 

Garvey's body was found on July 1, 1982, in Baytown, Texas, one month after she went missing. Authorities were unable to identify her body, but could determine that the victim was a white female between fifteen and twenty years old with blue eyes and curly red hair. The cause of death of the victim was determined to be strangulation. Her body was found wearing brown clothing, including a long-sleeved, button-down shirt with a distinct horse embroidery on the breast pocket. Her pants were made of corduroy material. The body was disposed of in a field after she died, possibly merely hours after her murder. She was buried near two other unidentified murder victims found in 1981 who were identified in 2021 as Dean and Tina Clouse. There was evidence that Garvey had been sexually assaulted. No bra or shoes were recovered and the shirt had also been unbuttoned.

Identification 
The body was exhumed in May 2011 to obtain a DNA profile to compare to potential matches, including Garvey's brother. An amateur online sleuth, Polly Penwell, came across the cases of Garvey and the unidentified body and suggested to the National Center for Missing and Exploited Children (NCMEC) and the Harris County medical examiner that they could be the same person after she compared both cases, while using a website known as Websleuths. Penwell said, describing her interest in unidentified people, "I felt so much sadness for them. I've always been very sensitive – compassionate, I guess – even as a little kid."

Garvey was identified in January 2014, through the efforts of NCMEC and by the Harris County Police Department, who had contacted her family and obtained samples of their DNA for testing in August 2013, to add to an old sample taken from her brother, which had previously been submitted to the National Missing and Unidentified Persons System and analyzed by the University of North Texas. She had remained unidentified for 31 years; Garvey was fourteen when she disappeared from Connecticut, and was fifteen at the time of her death, more than half-way across the country. Since her identification, authorities have continued their investigation, now aimed at finding Garvey's murderer.

It was revealed that Garvey likely ran away from home, escaping through a window, then probably hitched a ride with an unknown driver. Authorities expressed interest in how the victim arrived in Texas and what the motive for her murder may have been, as well as who may have transported her to where she later died. Her case was also possibly connected to other "Texas Killing Fields" murders, although no link has been officially determined.

After being returned from Texas to Connecticut, Garvey's body was reburied by her family on March 1, 2014, in Montville, Connecticut.

See also 
Death of Janice Young, where the victim remained unidentified for 41 years.
Murder of Tammy Alexander, where the victim remained unidentified for 35 years.
Murders of Dean and Tina Clouse, who were buried next to Garvey while all were unidentified.
Murder of Carol Cole, where the victim remained unidentified for 34 years.
Murder of Elizabeth Roberts, where the victim remained unidentified for 43 years.
List of solved missing person cases
List of unsolved murders

References

External links 

1980s missing person cases
1982 in Texas
1982 murders in the United States
Deaths by person in Texas
Deaths by strangulation in the United States
Formerly missing people
July 1982 events in the United States
July 1982 crimes
Missing person cases in Connecticut
Sexual assaults in the United States
Unsolved murders in the United States
Violence against women in the United States
Female murder victims
People murdered in Texas
Incidents of violence against girls
Murdered American children